Heo Jae-won (Hangul: 허재원; Hanja: 許宰源; born 1 July 1984) is a South Korean football player who last played for Jeonnam Dragons.

Career statistics 
As of end of 2011 season

References

External links 
 
 
 

1984 births
Living people
Association football defenders
South Korean footballers
Suwon Samsung Bluewings players
Gimcheon Sangmu FC players
Gwangju FC players
Jeju United FC players
Al-Khor SC players
Dibba FC players
Jeonnam Dragons players
K League 1 players
K League 2 players
Qatar Stars League players
UAE Pro League players
People from Uijeongbu
Sportspeople from Gyeonggi Province